Ciampi is a surname of Italian origin. Notable people with the surname include:
 Alimondo Ciampi (1876–1939), Italian sculptor
 Annalisa Ciampi, United Nations Special Rapporteur on the Rights to Freedom of Peaceful Assembly
 Anthony F. Ciampi (1816–1893), Italian-American priest 
 Carlo Azeglio Ciampi (1920–2016), former President of the Italian Republic
 Joe Ciampi (born 1946), retired American basketball coach
 Marcel Ciampi (1891–1980), French pianist and teacher
 Mario J. Ciampi (1907–2006), American architect
 Matteo Ciampi (1996), Italian swimmer
 Piero Ciampi (1934–1980), Italian singer-songwriter
 Vincenzo Ciampi (1967), Italian politician
 Vincenzo Legrenzo Ciampi, Italian opera composer
 Yves Ciampi (1921–1982), French director

Italian-language surnames